Deoria is a constituency of the Uttar Pradesh Legislative Assembly covering the city of Deoria in the Deoria district of Uttar Pradesh, India. This seat was known as Deoria North assembly from 1952 to 1967. In 1967, this seat has been changed to Deoria.

Deoria is one of five assembly constituencies in the Deoria Lok Sabha constituency. Since 2008, this assembly constituency is numbered 337 amongst 403 constituencies.

Election results

2022

2017
Bharatiya Janta Party candidate Satya Prakash Mani Tripathi won in last by election of 2020 Uttar Pradesh Legislative by elections defeating Samajwadi Party candidate B.S. Tripathi by a margin of around 20,000 votes.

Members of Legislative Assembly

Election Results

See also

 Deoria
 Deoria district
 Deoria Lok Sabha constituency

References

External links
 

Assembly constituencies of Uttar Pradesh
Deoria, Uttar Pradesh